Wikinews is a free-content news wiki and a project of the Wikimedia Foundation that works through collaborative journalism. Wikipedia co-founder Jimmy Wales has distinguished Wikinews from Wikipedia by saying, "On Wikinews, each story is to be written as a news story as opposed to an encyclopedia article." Wikinews's neutral point of view policy aims to distinguish it from other citizen journalism efforts such as Indymedia and OhmyNews. In contrast to most Wikimedia Foundation projects, Wikinews allows original work in the form of original reporting and interviews.

Early years

The first recorded proposal of a Wikimedia news site was a two-line anonymous post on January 5, 2003, on Wikipedia community's Meta-Wiki. Daniel Alston, who edited Wikipedia as Fonzy, claimed to have been the one who posted it. The proposal was then further developed by German freelance journalist, software developer, and author Erik Möller. Early opposition from long-time Wikipedia contributors, many of them pointing out the existence of Wikipedia's own news summaries, gave way to detailed discussions and proposals about how it could be implemented as a new project of the Wikimedia Foundation.

The domain name wikinews.org was registered on April 2, 2004. In November 2004, a demonstration wiki was established to show how such a collaborative news site might work. A month later, in December 2004, the site was moved out of the "demo" stage and into the beta stage under public domain copyleft. A German language edition was launched at the same time. Soon, editions in Italian, Dutch, French, Spanish, Swedish, Bulgarian, Polish, Portuguese, Romanian, Ukrainian, Serbian, Japanese, Russian, Hebrew, Arabic, Thai, Norwegian, Chinese, Turkish, Korean, Hungarian, Greek, Esperanto, Czech, Albanian, and Tamil (in that chronological order) were set up.

In September 2005, the project moved to the Creative Commons Attribution 2.5 license. On September 7, 2007, the English Wikinews published its 10,000th article.

Interviews 

Wikinews reporters have conducted interviews with several notable people, including an interview in December 2007 with Israeli President Shimon Peres by Wikinews reporter David Shankbone. Shankbone had been invited to conduct the interview by the America-Israel Friendship League and the Israeli foreign ministry.

Other notable interviews have included writers, actors, and politicians, such as Augusten Burroughs, several 2008 U.S. Republican Party presidential primaries candidates like Sam Brownback and Duncan Hunter, and others like British politician Tony Benn, writer Eric Bogosian, New Zealand politician Nick Smith, former New Zealand prime minister John Key, World Wide Web co-inventor Robert Cailliau, drag queen RuPaul, and former Wikimedia Foundation executive Sue Gardner.

Criticism 
Wikinews has been criticized for its alleged inability to remain neutral in perspective and provide verifiable, reliable sources. Robert McHenry, former editor-in-chief of the Encyclopædia Britannica, criticized the credibility of the project:

McHenry was skeptical about Wikinews' ability to provide a neutral point of view and its claim to be evenhanded: "The naïveté is stunning."

In a 2007 interview given to Wikinews, Sue Gardner, at that time a special adviser to the board of the Wikimedia Foundation and former head of the Canadian Broadcasting Corporation's Internet division, CBC.ca, dismissed McHenry's comment, stating:

Wikinews has also had issues with maintaining a separate identity from Wikipedia, which also covers major news events in real-time.  Columnist Jonathan Dee of The New York Times said in 2007 that "So indistinct has the line between past and present become that Wikipedia has inadvertently all but strangled one of its sister projects, the three-year-old Wikinews... [Wikinews] has sunk into a kind of torpor; lately it generates just 8 to 10 articles a day... On bigger stories there's just no point in competing with the ruthless purview of the encyclopedia."  Andrew Lih and Zachary M. Seward commented on the continuing issue in a 2010 piece in the Nieman Journalism Lab called "Why Wikipedia beats Wikinews as a collaborative journalism project." Lih wrote "it's not clear that the wiki process really gears itself towards deadlines and group narrative writing" and that "if you're trying to write something approaching a feature piece, it's much harder to get more than two or three people to stay consistent with the style."  Lih considers Wikipedia's stricter "formula" for article composition an advantage in a large wiki with many editors.  Brian Keegan wrote in 2019 that the Wikinews model of requiring approval before publication ultimately limited its ability to grow, especially compared to the more open nature of Wikipedia.

Thomas Roessing wrote in The International Encyclopedia of Journalism Studies in 2019 about journalism on Wikipedia and Wikinews: "Many people turn to Wikipedia for more information after they received news from the mass media ... There is a substantial danger of havoc resulting from hasty handling of information about an unfolding situation." Roessing presents the issue of a "citation cycle", where professional journalists turn to Wikipedia for research, but the Wikipedia community goes to mass media sources for breaking news articles. Roessing writes about the problem of differentiating Wikipedia and Wikinews: "The quality and the speed in which Wikipedia responds to news is one of the challenges to Wikinews." Additionally, Roessing refers to an analogy made by author Matthew Yeomans: "Usually, Wikinews retells stories that were first published by Internet outlets of the traditional mass media (which also serve as sources for Wikinews’ articles). This tends to result in “dull regurgitation of facts” as Yeomans (2005) put it."

Language editions 
The active sites have  articles and the closed sites have  articles.

The top ten Wikinews language projects by mainspace article count:

See also
 WikiTribune
 Wikitorial

References

External links 

 
 Wikinews Statistics

Advertising-free websites
American news websites
Citizen journalism
Creative Commons-licensed websites
Internet properties established in 2004
Multilingual websites
Wikimedia projects